Thongsuk Sampahungsith  is a Thai football coach.

Honours

International
 Sea Games 2007  Gold medal  Thailand U 23

Bangkok F.C.
 Regional League Bangkok Area Division ;Winners (1) : 2010

References
 

Living people
Thongsuk Sampahungsith
1953 births